Ziziphus celata, commonly known as the Florida jujube or Florida ziziphus, is a terrestrial flowering plant endemic to central Florida.

Description
It is a small spiny shrub that is usually less than 2 meters tall.  Clusters of highly fragrant tiny green flowers are borne in winter, and grape-sized, yellow-orange fruit develop in spring.

Range
The species is currently restricted to just eight sites which collectively support only a few genetically distinct individuals.

The first known record of the plant was from a single, mysterious, dried herbarium specimen originally collected in 1948 near the city of Sebring in Highlands County, Florida, U.S. Because the precise location of the locality had not been recorded by Ray Garrett, of Avon Park, and because no living plants were known to exist in the wild, the species was presumed extinct. In 1984 the species was described and named posthumously by W.S. Judd & D.W. Hall of the University of Florida. Many botanists later searched for Ziziphus celata, but none were successful until 1987 when the species was rediscovered by Kris R. DeLaney, a Florida botanist also from Avon Park.  DeLaney later discovered two additional populations, one consisting of only a single large plant, the other of several dozen scattered over, and persisting in, a large area of improved cattle pasture.  Ziziphus celata is very nearly extinct. Of the eight known populations, four are in old pastures, three on degraded sites, and the most recent discovery is in its natural sandhill habitat, found in early April, 2007 by Brett Miley, a Florida ecologist, while photographing other endangered plants.

Habitat
Very little remains of central Florida's once vast upland ecosystems.  Agribusiness and unplanned, sprawling commercial development in central and south Florida, along with inadequate conservation and regulatory programs, have decimated Florida's ecosystems and pushed hundreds of native plant and animals species to the brink of extinction. Florida's ecosystems and vegetative communities have been so completely disrupted, and so much genetic diversity lost, that many formerly widespread and common plants are considered to be "genetically" extinct, and incapable of adapting and surviving as part of a functioning ecosystem.

Ziziphus celata is listed as an endangered species in the United States.

References

External links
Archbold Plant Ecology Lab: Ziziphus celata
Center for Plant Conservation: Ziziphus celata

celata
Endemic flora of Florida
Endangered flora of the United States